Tafilalt or Tafilet, historically Sijilmasa, is a region and the largest oasis in Morocco.

Etymology
The word "Tafilalt" is an Amazigh word and it means "Jug", which is specifically a pottery jar used to store water.

History
Although previous settlements existed, especially during the Roman period, the first continuously inhabited town in the area after the spread of Islam was Sijilmasa, founded by the Midrarid dynasty. It was on the direct caravan route from the Niger river to Tangier, and attained a considerable degree of prosperity. 

In the 17th century, the 'Alawi dynasty of Morocco first achieved political ascendancy in Tafilalt, and in 1606, Sultan Zidan Abu Maali hid in Tafilalt, where he made a profit off of gold mined in the area, built an army, eventually taking control of the city of Marrakesh. A few years later in 1610, Ahmed ibn Abi Mahalli also built up an army in the Tafilalt area and took Marrakesh back for himself, but lost control after Sidi Yahya ben Younes liberated the city for Zidan. A decade after this, a revolutionary movement arose in Tafilalt against the ruling sultan, but was repressed after four months of skirmishes. Later, Tafilalt was a major center of the Dila'ites. In 1648, a custom was established by Moorish sultans of Morocco sending superfluous sons or daughters who would not inherit titles or power to Tafilalt.

Medieval traveler Ibn Battuta wrote about visiting Sijilmasa (near Tafilalt) in the fourteenth century on his journey from Fez to Mali, "the country of the blacks". It was later destroyed in 1818 by the Aït Atta, but its ruins remain, including two gateways. The first European to visit Tafilalt in the modern era was René Caillié (1828), and later Gerhard Rohlfs (1864). English writer W. B. Harris described Tafilalt in a journal after his visit.

Geography
Entirely located along the Ziz River, the oasis was, before mechanized transport, ten days' journey south of Fez and Meknes, across the Atlas Mountains. It is known for its dates.

Notable residents
It is the birthplace of the famed Rabbi Israel Abuhatzeira, known as the "Baba Sali" (lit. "Praying Father"), (1889–1984).

In literature
Mercenaries of Hell (original title Pokol zsoldosai), a novel by the famous Hungarian author Jenő Rejtő takes place in the village and surrounding area.

References

Further reading
.

External link

Oases of Morocco
'Alawi dynasty
Geography of Drâa-Tafilalet
Ramsar sites in Morocco